Zolgokh is a traditional Mongolian formal greeting. Two people hold both their arms out, and the younger person's arms are placed under the elder person's and grasps their elbows to show support for their elder. The two people then touch each other's cheeks, usually accompanied with the phrase Amar mend üü, meaning "Are you well and peaceful?".

Tsagaan sar
In Modern contexts, the greeting is usually reserved for Tsagaan sar celebrations, where people greet each other with zolgokh, while sometimes holding a khadag and suutei tsai.

Zolgokh is usually first performed among family members on the morning of the festival (the husband and wife do not perform the greeting with each other). The greeting is first performed with the eldest people in the family, sometimes accompanied with a gift of money and/or khadag.

Name
The greeting would more accurately be termed Zolgolt, but the word "Zolgokh" has become more widespread in English. The verb form in Mongolian is "Zolgo", and the "-kh" is added to mean "to zolgo". The noun form of the greeting in Mongolian is thus Zolgolt, the suffix "-lt" being added to form a noun.

References
Definition of Zolgokh, Wisdomlib

Greetings
Mongolian culture
Gestures of respect